Robert Plane may refer to:

 Robert A. Plane (1927-2018), American chemistry professor and college administrator
 Robert Plane (clarinettist), British clarinettist